The United States secretary of housing and urban development (or HUD secretary) is the head of the United States Department of Housing and Urban Development, a member of the president's Cabinet, and thirteenth in the presidential line of succession. The post was created with the formation of the Department of Housing and Urban Development on September 9, 1965, by President Lyndon B. Johnson's signing of  into law. The department's mission is "to increase homeownership, support community development and increase access to affordable housing free from discrimination."

Secretary of Housing and Urban Development is a Level I position in the Executive Schedule, thus earning a salary of US$221,400, as of January 2021.

, Marcia Fudge is the secretary of housing and urban development.

List of secretaries of housing and urban development
Parties
 (9)
 (9)
 Status

References

External links 
 

|-

Housing and Urban Development
Housing and Urban Development